Hawkman or Hawkmen may refer to:

In comics

In DC Comics:
Hawkman (Katar Hol)
Hawkman (Carter Hall)
Hawkman (Fel Andar)
Hawkmen, members of Thanagar's police force in DC Comics

Other:
Hawkmen, the bird-like people led by Prince Vultan in Flash Gordon stories
Hawkman, a villain in the manga Kinnikuman

In music

Hawkman, stage name of Garrison Hawk, a reggae artist who collaborated with trip-hop artist Tricky
"Hawkman," nickname for MC Hawking

See also

Falconry
Birdman (disambiguation)